The 1988 South Australian Open also known for this event as the Australian Hard Court Championships was a Grand Prix tennis circuit tournament held at Memorial Drive in Adelaide, Australia. The tournament was held from 28 December 1987 to 5 January 1988. Third-seeded Mark Woodforde won the singles title.

Finals

Singles

 Mark Woodforde defeated  Wally Masur 6–2, 6–4
 It was  Woodforde's first singles title of the year and the second of his career.

Doubles

 Darren Cahill /  Mark Kratzmann defeated  Carl Limberger /  Mark Woodforde 4–6, 6–2, 7–5

References

External links
 ITF tournament edition details